There are at least 8 members of the Creosote Bush, Maple and Sumac order: Sapindales found in Montana.  Some of these species are exotics (not native to Montana).

Creosote bush
Family: Zygophyllaceae
Tribulus terrestris, puncture-vine
Zygophyllum fabago, Syrian bean-caper

Maple
Family: Aceraceae
Acer glabrum, Rocky Mountain maple
Acer negundo, box-elder
Acer platanoides, Norway maple

Sumac
Family:  Anacardiaceae
Rhus glabra, smooth sumac
Rhus trilobata, skunkbush sumac
Toxicodendron rydbergii, western poison-ivy

See also
 List of dicotyledons of Montana

Notes

Further reading
 

Creosote
Montana